Bella Milo (born 29 May 1986) is a Samoan rugby union player. She competed for Samoa at the 2006 and 2014 Rugby World Cups. She has also represented Samoa in sevens rugby.

Biography 
Milo represented Samoa at the 2006 and 2014 Rugby World Cups. In 2014 she took up her cousin's suggestion to play in Hong Kong and three years later she became the backs and the strength and conditioning coach for Hong Kong. She made her third World Cup appearance in 2017 as Hong Kong's assistant coach.

In 2016 Milo featured for the Samoa 7s team at the Olympic repechage tournament in Ireland.

References 

Living people
1986 births
Female rugby union players
Samoa women's national rugby union team players